The 1976 Grand Prix d'Automne was the 70th edition of the Paris–Tours cycle race and was held on 26 September 1976. The race started in Tours and finished in Versailles. The race was won by Ronald De Witte.

General classification

References

1976 in French sport
1976
1976 Super Prestige Pernod
Grand Prix d'Automne